Chandranehru Chandrakanthan (born 12 April 1970) is a Sri Lankan Tamil politician and former Member of Parliament.

Early life and family
Chandrakanthan was born on 12 April 1970. He is the son of assassinated Tamil National Alliance (TNA) MP A. Chandranehru.

Career
Chandrakanthan was appointed as a TNA National List MP in the Sri Lankan Parliament in September 2006, replacing Joseph Pararajasingam who had been assassinated in December 2005. He contested the 2010 parliamentary election as one of the TNA's candidates in Ampara District but failed to get elected after coming second amongst the TNA candidates.

References

1970 births
Living people
Members of the 13th Parliament of Sri Lanka
People from Eastern Province, Sri Lanka
Sri Lankan Christians
Sri Lankan Tamil politicians
Tamil National Alliance politicians